This is a complete list of four-star generals in the United States Army, past and present. The rank of general (or full general, or four-star general) is the highest rank normally achievable in the U.S. Army. It ranks above lieutenant general (three-star general) and below General of the Army (five-star general).

There have been 256 four-star generals in the history of the U.S. Army. Of these, 242 achieved that rank while on active duty in the U.S. Army; eight were promoted after retirement; five were promoted posthumously; and one (George Washington) was appointed to that rank in the Continental Army, the U.S. Army's predecessor. Generals entered the Army via several paths: 161 were commissioned via the U.S. Military Academy (USMA), 53 via Reserve Officer Training Corps (ROTC) at a civilian university, 16 via direct commission (direct), 14 via Officer Candidate School (OCS), 8 via ROTC at a senior military college, one via ROTC at a military junior college, one via direct commission in the Army National Guard (ARNG), one via the aviation cadet program, and one via battlefield commission.

List of generals
Entries in the following list of four-star generals are indexed by the numerical order in which each officer was promoted to that rank while on active duty, or by an asterisk (*) if the officer did not serve in that rank while on active duty in the U.S. Army. Each entry lists the general's name, date of rank, active-duty positions held while serving at four-star rank, number of years of active-duty service at four-star rank (Yrs), year commissioned and source of commission, number of years in commission when promoted to four-star rank (YC), and other biographical notes.

History

Four-star positions

1775–1799
In 1775, George Washington was appointed "General and Commander in Chief of the United Colonies" and all its forces. Although Washington ranked as a full general in the Continental Army, he resigned his commission prior to the establishment of the U.S. Army in 1784 and he is therefore considered never to have held the U.S. Army rank of general. In 1798, Washington was commissioned lieutenant general in the U.S. Army and appointed Commander in Chief of the armies of the United States. The following year, Congress created the rank of General of the Armies of the United States, but Washington died before accepting it and the rank lapsed until 1866. Washington was finally promoted to General of the Armies in 1976.

1866–1941

The grade of General of the Armies of the United States was revived in 1866, under the name "General of the Army of the United States" to honor the Civil War achievements of Ulysses S. Grant, the commanding general of the U.S. Army (CGUSA). When Grant resigned his commission to become President in 1869, William T. Sherman was promoted to fill the vacant grade. Congress specified in 1870 that the rank would expire upon Sherman's retirement, but made an exception in 1888 to promote an ailing Philip H. Sheridan. This title is not to be confused with the later five-star rank of General of the Army.

In 1917, the rank of general was recreated in the National Army, a temporary force of conscripts and volunteers authorized for the duration of the World War I emergency. To give American commanders parity of rank with their Allied counterparts, Congress allowed the President to appoint two emergency generals in the National Army, specified to be the chief of staff of the Army (CSA), Tasker H. Bliss and later Peyton C. March; and the commander of United States forces in France, John J. Pershing. When March replaced Bliss as chief of staff, Bliss was continued in four-star rank by brevet as the U.S. military representative to the Supreme War Council. In contrast to the previous grade of general held by Grant, Sherman, and Sheridan, which was a permanent promotion, this new rank was a temporary appointment that was lost when the officer vacated the position bearing that rank, and while Pershing was ultimately advanced to General of the Armies in 1919, March and Bliss reverted to their permanent grades of major general in the Regular Army when the National Army disbanded in 1920.

In 1929, the temporary rank of general in the Regular Army was reauthorized for the office of chief of staff, whose occupant reverted to major general at the end of his term but was allowed to retire as a full general. When the draft force was reconstituted for World War II as the Army of the United States in 1941, the President was authorized to appoint as many temporary generals in that organization as he deemed necessary. As with the National Army emergency generals, these appointments expired after the end of the war, although postwar legislation allowed officers to retire in their highest active-duty rank.

1941–1991

The modern rank of general was established by the Officer Personnel Act of 1947, which authorized the President to designate certain positions of importance to carry that rank. Officers appointed to such positions bear temporary four-star rank while so serving, and are allowed to retire at that rank if their performance is judged satisfactory. The total number of active-duty four-star generals in the Army is limited to a fixed percentage of the number of Army general officers serving at all ranks.

Within the Army, the chief of staff (CSA) and vice chief of staff (VCSA) are four-star generals by statute. Since World War II, the commanders of the Army formations in Europe (USAREUR) and East Asia (FECOM/USFK) have been designated four-star generals by reason of importance. Other designated four-star Army commands have included the various training, readiness, and materiel organizations.

The Army also competes with the other services for a number of joint four-star positions, the most prestigious of which are the chairman of the Joint Chiefs of Staff (CJCS) and the NATO supreme allied commander in Europe (SACEUR). Other joint four-star positions have included unified combatant commanders; certain NATO staff positions; and the wartime theater commanders in Vietnam (MACV), Iraq (MNF-I), and Afghanistan (ISAF/RS).

1991–present

See also
 General (United States)
 General officers in the United States
 List of active duty United States four-star officers
 List of lieutenant generals in the United States Army before 1960
 List of United States Army lieutenant generals from 1990 to 1999
 List of United States Army lieutenant generals from 2000 to 2009
 List of United States Army lieutenant generals from 2010 to 2019
 List of United States Army lieutenant generals since 2020
 List of major generals in the United States Regular Army before July 1, 1920
 List of brigadier generals in the United States Regular Army before February 2, 1901
 List of United States Air Force four-star generals
 List of United States Coast Guard four-star admirals
 List of United States Marine Corps four-star generals
 List of United States military leaders by rank
 List of United States Navy four-star admirals
 List of United States Public Health Service Commissioned Corps four-star admirals
 List of United States Space Force four-star generals
 List of British Army full generals
 Staff (military)

References

Bibliography

 
 
 
 
 
 
 
 
  
 
 
 
 

United States Army
United States Army generals
 
Generals
United States Army generals